Hillside is an unincorporated community and a U.S. Post Office in Fremont County, Colorado, United States.  The Hillside Post Office has the ZIP Code 81232.

Geography
Hillside is located at  (38.264872,-105.612774).

References

Unincorporated communities in Fremont County, Colorado
Unincorporated communities in Colorado